The RD-191 is a high-performance single-combustion chamber rocket engine, developed in Russia. It is derived from the RD-180 dual-combustion chamber engine, which itself was derived in turn from the four-chamber RD-170 originally used in the Energia launcher.

The RD-191 is fueled by a kerosene / LOX mixture and uses an oxygen-rich staged combustion cycle. In the future the engine is expected to become a workhorse in the Russian space sector, as older launch vehicles are phased out of production and service.

Design
Burn ignition is provided chemically, by feeding a starter fluid into the combustion chamber and gas generator, which is self-igniting on contact with liquid oxygen. The engine is capable of throttling down to 30% of nominal thrust; the design also allows for a short-duration enhanced thrust (up to 105% of nominal level) in emergency situations. A Cardan suspension provides for yaw and pitch controls by gimballed thrust deflection up to 8 degrees.

A modern design, the engine incorporates sensors monitoring burn conditions. The measurements are used for telemetry and an emergency protection system.

The engine's powerhead fulfills two additional functions, heating helium gas for pressurization of propellant tanks and generating hydraulic power for hydraulic actuators to deflect the nozzle and aerodynamic rudders.

Development
On 5 September 2008, the creator of the engine, NPO Energomash, stated that the engine had completed the full cycle of development and burn tests and is ready for manufacturing and delivery. The primary launch vehicle utilizing this engine is the Angara carrier rocket family, first flown in 2014. 

By 2010, the engine had passed all development phases, and its nine prototypes had accumulated over 23,000 seconds in 105 firing tests, with one of them reaching the maximum running time of 3,635 seconds in 12 tests. In July 2014, the engine made its maiden flight, propelling the Angara 1.2pp test vehicle on a suborbital flight. In December 2014, the engine flew again, powering the Angara A5 heavy carrier rocket. In the same month, Orbital Sciences announced it would purchase RD-181 engines, a variant of the RD-191, for use on the Antares rocket.

Variants

RD-151
A version of the RD-191 with thrust reduced to 170 tonnes, called RD-151, was fire-tested on 30 July 2009. The first flight test of this engine was conducted on 25 August 2009 as part of the first launch of South Korean Naro-1 rocket.

RD-181

The RD-181 is based on the RD-191 and is adapted for integration on the Antares rocket. While the RD-193 was designed as a close replacement for the NK-33, on 17 December 2014, Orbital Sciences announced that it would use the NPO Energomash RD-181 on the version 2 Antares launch vehicle and had contracted directly with NPO Energomash for up to 20 RD-181 engines. Two engines are used on the first stage of each Antares, which is currently used to carry cargo to the International Space Station under contract to NASA. While Russian press had stated that the contract was valued at US$ 1 billion with options, Orbital stated on 26 January 2015 that even when exercising all the options the contract was less than that amount, and that the initial contractual commitment was significantly less than that. On 19 February 2015, Orbital ATK said that its revamped Antares rocket featuring a new main engine would make its first launch in March 2016. On 29 May 2015, Orbital stated that the new engines had successfully conducted seven certification firings and all went as expected. It also stated that the first two flight models were doing final tests and would be delivered to Orbital in early July.

The two RD-181s have  more thrust than the paired AJ-26 engines used on the first-generation Antares. The AJ-26 engines were just rebranded NK-33 rocket engines used for the ill-fated Soviet N1 and upgraded N1F rocket, which was planned to be the rocket to take cosmonauts to the surface of the Moon.

For the Antares 230+ upgrades, debuted with the CRS-2 Cygnus NG-12 mission, heat exchangers were removed from the RD-181 engine.

RD-193

In April 2013, it was announced that a further derivation, the RD-193, had completed testing. This version is lighter and shorter, designed for use on the light-launcher Soyuz-2.1v when the inventory of surplus NK-33 engines is exhausted.

See also 
 Comparison of orbital rocket engines

References

External links

 

Rocket engines of Russia
Rocket engines using kerosene propellant
Rocket engines using the staged combustion cycle
Energomash rocket engines